The 1938 election for Mayor of Los Angeles took place on September 16, 1938 following the recall of incumbent Frank L. Shaw. Shaw was defeated by Fletcher Bowron in the election, making him the first recalled mayor in American history.<ref name=HerEx>[http://dbase1.lapl.org/webpics/calindex/documents/16/523864.pdf John R. Babcock, "When Los Angeles Was a World-Class City of Corruption," Los Angeles Herald-Examiner," May 12, 1989, page A-19]</ref>

Municipal elections in California, including Mayor of Los Angeles, are officially nonpartisan; candidates' party affiliations do not appear on the ballot.

 Election 
Shaw had been accosted with corruption in City Hall which led to a recall movement against him and his close associates. Reformers who opposed Shaw and the Los Angeles Times'' both agreed that Shaw was "building the largest machine in the city's history," choosing Fletcher Bowron, a Judge of the Los Angeles County Superior Court, to run against Shaw. The reformers campaigned for Shaw's recall saying that he did not do enough to stop crime and that he had supposedly committeed arious crimes during his tenure. The recall was approved by voters by a large margin, and Bowron defeated Shaw by a landslide.

Results

References and footnotes

External links
 Office of the City Clerk, City of Los Angeles

1938
Los Angeles
Los Angeles
Mayoral recall election
Los Angeles 1938